Mong Tseng Tsuen is a village in Yuen Long District, New Territories, Hong Kong.

Administration
Mong Tseng Tsuen is a recognized village under the New Territories Small House Policy.

See also
 Mong Tseng Wai

References

External links

 Delineation of area of existing village Mong Tseng Tsuen (Ping Shan) for election of resident representative (2019 to 2022)

Villages in Yuen Long District, Hong Kong